Rogue Galaxy is an action role-playing video game developed by Level-5 and published by Sony Computer Entertainment for the PlayStation 2. The game was released in Japan in December 2005, in North America in January 2007, and in most European countries and Australia in September the same year. A director's cut of the game was released in Japan in March 2007, which includes all of the added features and improvements made for the North American and European localizations.

The game follows the adventures of Jaster Rogue, a young agricultural worker living on an isolated planet, who becomes involved in a galactic conflict, and learns the fate of the entire galaxy lies in his hands. At the time of its release, Rogue Galaxy was the largest game Level-5 had ever developed, both in terms of the number of staff working on it and the length of production (over three years). Both Level-5 and Sony had strong expectations for the game, hoping it would challenge the RPG market dominance of the Final Fantasy and Dragon Quest franchises.

Rogue Galaxy received generally positive reviews, with critics praising the graphics, range of side quests and scope of the game. Some, however, were critical of the plot and character development. Although the game went on to win several gaming awards, it did not sell as well as had been hoped, failing to meet Sony's expectations of selling one million units.

Gameplay
Rogue Galaxy is an action role-playing game played from a third-person perspective in which the player moves through a continuous environment, with no load time between overworld exploration and combat. Battles occur as random encounters, a la traditional role-playing video games such as Square's Final Fantasy X or Level-5's own Dragon Quest VIII: Journey of the Cursed King. However, unlike such games, which feature turn-based combat, Rogue Galaxy uses a real-time hack and slash combat system in which the player fights with a party of three characters. The player has direct control over only one character, although which character this is can be changed at any time. The two NPCs fight independently of the player character, based on the strategy selected prior to the battle. Available strategies include fighting very aggressively, targeting a specific enemy, or not fighting at all. The strategy can also be changed at any time during the battle. Additionally, the player can issue specific orders to the NPCs during combat, such as having them use an item or activate one of their special abilities. NPC allies will also offer advice to the player character, such as suggesting they perform a special move or use a particular item. The player is given a choice of either ignoring the advice, or picking one of the available options. NPCs will not perform any special moves or use items unless the player tells them to, or has selected a particular strategy prior to the battle.

During combat, each character has an "Action Gauge", which decrease with each action taken. When it is empty, the player can no longer attack, and must wait for the gauge to automatically refill, or instantly refill by successfully blocking an enemy attack. Each character's secondary weapon has its own individual gauge, which depletes with each use, and must be automatically refilled before the weapon can be used again. This gauge is independent of the attack gauge, and during combat it can only be refilled a certain number of times before the secondary weapon is no longer available for use.

As well as fighting independently of one another, and performing their own unique abilities, players can also perform team abilities, although the correct characters must be active in the battle for a particular team ability to be available for use. The player also has a special attack, the "Burning Strike". In the original Japanese release, the Burning Strike occurred at random irrespective of the player's actions, but this was altered for the North American and European versions to allow the player to choose when to use the attack. Once enough "Burning Chips" have been collected from slain enemies, the player can activate the Burning Strike whenever they wish. The player must then follow a series of button prompts to string together combo attacks, which deal more damage the more attacks are successfully chained.

When the game begins, the storyline follows a linear path, but at a certain point, the game world opens up, and the player is free to move from planet to planet using the pirate ship, Dorgenark. In the overworld, the player can move around by walking, but can also transport from any activated save point on the map to any other activated point on that planet, although they cannot transport to a save point on another planet.

Revelation Flow

Character abilities and power-ups are handled via a feature called the "Revelation Flow". Similar to the "Sphere Grid" in Final Fantasy X and the "License Board" in Final Fantasy XII, the Revelation Flow is not based on a traditional experience point/leveling up system. Instead of characters gaining pre-determined statistical bonuses as they increase in level, they gain abilities and stat increases by placing items in the Revelation Flow. Once all of the prerequisite items have been placed, the particular ability/stat increase becomes available. Each character has their own unique Revelation Flow, with a different layout, different abilities and different item requirements.

Weapons
The game features a "Weapon Synthesis" system similar to Dark Cloud and Dark Chronicle, which allows the player to combine weapons. For every victory in battle, each weapon carried by active characters gains experience points. When a weapon has gained a certain amount of experience, it becomes "Maxed". After a weapon is maxed, it continues to gain additional experience in specific elemental categories - fire, ice, lightning, wind, and holy. When the experience and the elemental damage are both at maximum, a weapon is "Mastered" and cannot be improved any further. Once a weapon is maxed, it becomes available for synthesis with another maxed weapon of the same type. When two maxed weapons are synthesized, a stronger weapon is created, and must be maxed again to become available for subsequent synthesis.

Synthesis is carried out by a character within the game called "Toady", a frog who can swallow two weapons and then regurgitate a new weapon. Toady can also analyze maxed weapons and make suggestions for synthesis combinations. These suggestions are recorded in the "Frog Log". Toady will also warn the player if an attempted combination is going to result in a decrease in stats, or with a weapon for which the player's level is not yet high enough.

Sidequests
The game features numerous optional gameplay elements beyond the main storyline. For example, early in the game, the player can begin to compete in the "Insectron Tournament". Similar to Dark Chronicles fishing mini-game, the player must capture and breed Insectrons (bugs), which can then be entered into a tournament where they fight other Insectrons, in a manner similar to a game of chess. Once an Insectron has been captured, the player can increase its stats by feeding it certain food or breeding it with another Insectron of the opposite sex. The Insectron Tournament awards prizes as the player move through the various ranks.

Another sidequest is "Factory". At a later point in the game, the player gains access to a reconfigurable factory. By talking to specific characters in the overworld, the player can acquire blueprints, which can be used to assemble specific equipment and raw materials so as to make new items, which then become available for purchase in the various shops throughout the game.

A further sidequest is "Challenge battles", which occur randomly throughout the game. In these battles, specific conditions must be met, such as finishing the battle without taking damage, finishing within a certain time limit, using only one character, or not using any items or abilities. If the player wins the battle and fulfills the condition, they receive a "Hunter Coin". These coins can be used to purchase different levels of "Hunter Licenses", which are required in some shops to purchase certain items. Additionally, the higher the player's license, the lower the prices for general items.

The game also includes a "Hunter Ranking" system whereby the player is awarded "Hunter Points" for killing a specific number of particular enemies. As the player's rank increases, prizes are awarded. Tied into the hunter system are "Quarries" - mini-bosses which award a lot of hunter points. Unlike standard monsters, quarries must be purchased before they become available. Once the player has purchased the quarry, they must locate it on the map and then use a specific item to initiate the battle.

The game also features a completion chart, which records the player's progress through various aspects of gameplay; "Hunter Ranking" (the goal is to top the league of hunters), "Rare Items" (collect all nine rare items in the game), "Quarries" (successfully defeat all available quarries), "Hunting Record" (attain maximum hunter points by killing all of the specified enemies), "Insectron" (win the highest tournament rank), "Revelation Flow" (complete every character's Revelation Flow), "Frog Log" (have Toady analyze at least one-hundred weapons and produce at least fifty), and "Factory" (produce all forty items available in the factory). When any single aspect is completed to 100%, an award is given, usually in the form of a new costume for one of the characters.

Story

Characters
 Jaster Rogue

The game's protagonist and the main playable character. Jaster is seventeen years old, and has a distinctive birthmark on his cheek. He lives on the planet of Rosa with his adoptive father, Raul (Peter Renaday), where he works in the agricultural sector. Resentful of the presence on the planet of the Longardian army, he yearns to leave and explore space. He is given just such an opportunity when he encounters the crew of the intergalactic pirate ship Dorgenark.

 Kisala

The adopted daughter of Dorgengoa (Fred Tatasciore), captain of the Dorgenark.

 Zegram Ghart

A former bounty hunter who joined the Dorgenarks crew several years prior to the beginning of the game.

 Simon Wicard

A member of the Dorgenarks crew. Cheerful and optimistic, he wears a mask and speaks in a heavy Scottish accent.

 Steve

An android created by Dr. Pocacchio (Marc Graue), he is the navigator of the Dorgenark.

 Lilika Rhyza

A warrior from the planet Juraika, Lilika joins the Dorgenarks crew shortly after Jaster.

 Deego Aegis

A former elite soldier for the Longardian army, he has a robotic arm, and yearns for peace in the galaxy.

 Jupis Tooki McGanel

A lizard-like alien known as a Granshee. Regarded as the greatest hacker in the galaxy, he is a former scientist who devoted his life's work to the spaceship manufacturing megacorporation Daytron.

 Desert Claw

The galaxy's most famous bounty hunter. When the game begins, the crew of the Dorgenark are looking to hire him.

Plot
The game begins with Jaster foraging in the desert outside his home town of Salgin on the planet Rosa. Meanwhile, Simon and Steve arrive in Salgin looking for Desert Claw. As Jaster returns, he complains to his adopted father, Raul, about the presence of the Longardian Federation on the planet, who are ostensibly there to protect it from the Draxian Empire. As they talk, a beast attacks the town. Jaster rushes outside and is attacked by a group of smaller beasts. With the help of a stranger, he fights them off, and they head to face the main beast. Upon seeing Steve and Simon, the stranger leaves Jaster, giving him his sword. Steve recognizes the sword as Desert Claw's sword, "Desert Seeker - one of the Seven Sacred Galactic Swords" and concludes that Jaster is Desert Claw. As such, they join him in fighting the beast. They defeat it, and Steve tells Jaster their boss wants to hire him. When Jaster learns they are space pirates working for the legendary Dorgengoa, he decides to join, maintaining the ruse that he is Desert Claw.

On board, he meets Kisala, Zegram and the chief mate, Monsha (Quinton Flynn). While passing the Rose Nebula on their way to Zerard, the Dorgenark is attacked by beasts and crashes on the jungle planet Juraika, where they meet Lilika, a member of the local Burkaqua tribe, who joins the crew. They resume their journey to Zerard, where they renew the ship's galactic travel visa from the Galaxy Corporation, after a stint in Rosencaster Prison, and the inadvertent recruitment of Jupis to the ship's crew.

Meanwhile, Dorgengoa sees Jaster for the first time, immediately recognizing he is not Desert Claw. He orders Jaster be thrown overboard, but Kisala refuses to allow it. Dorgengoa decides to test Jaster's ability. First, he reveals he is seeking the lost planet of Eden, which is said to have disappeared 10,000 years ago. The key to finding Eden is the "Great Tablets", which are also lost, and for which Dorgengoa is searching. A tablet is believed to have been recently excavated on the planet Vedan. The crew head to the Vedanian mining town of Myna. There they meet Deego and his girlfriend Angela (Heather Halley). Deego helps the group get into the mines, but not in time to save the tablet from Daytron, who take it to Rosa. Deego decides to join the crew of the Dorgenark, and Angela promises to wait for him to return.

The party arrives on Rosa and heads to the ruins in the Sylvazard Desert. The Tablet arrives and three pedestals are revealed, on which must be set three "Key Pieces". Meanwhile, Daytron president Valkog Drazer (David Lodge) and his assistant, Norma Kissleigh (Michelle Ruff), arrive with Seed (Jason Spisak), a masked servant, who engages the crew in battle. They are unable to defeat him but are rescued by Desert Claw, who promptly leaves again. On the Dorgenark, they tell Dorgengoa about the pedestals, and Deego guesses the Key Pieces are probably located within the three Ruins of the Ancient Kings.

The party manages to acquire the three Key Pieces, and Jaster places them on the pedestals, transforming the Tablet into a massive three-dimensional puzzle structure. Seed begins an incantation and sets about manipulating the structure. However, he proves unable to solve the puzzle and transforms into a massive beast. He attacks the party, but Jaster unleashes a ferocious power, defeating him. Jaster then uses his power to solve the puzzle, opening the gates to a labyrinth. Deego speculates Jaster may be a descendant of the Star King, an ancient king who ruled the entire galaxy 50,000 years ago. After opening the labyrinth, a confused Jaster returns to normal, and the crew enter.

Inside, they encounter Ragnar (Chris Edgerly), a robot who explains Kisala is actually Princess Irieth of Mariglenn, the planet also known as Eden. He gives her the key to open the Gates of Eden. Meanwhile, the Daytron flagship, the Emperor attacks Salgin. Valkog demands the key from Jaster who is about to acquiesce, when Raul fires an electromagnetic pulse at the Emperor, partially disabling it. The ship fires on Raul's church before retreating. Raul dies in Jaster's arms after giving him an artifact that points to the apparently deserted Kuje Desert. In the middle of Kuje, the party finds a village, Joannasburg. There, they meet the spirit of the long-dead Joanna (C. C. Seymour). She explains she is a descendant of the Star King, as is her son; Jaster. Desert Claw arrives, telling Jaster he is his father. He gave Jaster to Raul while he prepared for the day when Jaster would awaken the power of the Star King and open the Gates of Eden.

Jaster uses the key and a space portal appears above Rosa. After passing through, the crew Mariglenn, where they are greeted by Queen Freidias (Wendee Lee), who tells Kisala she is her mother. Freidias then tells the story of Mariglenn; tens of thousands of years ago, the planet was attacked by evil energy known as Rune, which possesses the power to turn living beings into beasts. Mother, the essence of Rune, took control of the planet, and the people realized that once Mariglenn was destroyed, Mother would move onto another planet, eventually destroying the entire galaxy. As such, Freidias sealed Mariglenn into a "space-time cleft". Only one person can defeat Mother – the Star King.

The crew travel to Ti'atha Forest where they encounter the spirit of Kisala's father, King Albioth (Fred Tatasciore). Albioth had faced Mother, but lost and had turned into a beast. He tells them the only way she can be defeated is by neutralizing the power of her Rune, using Drigellum energy; which can only be found in the hearts of good people. Each of the party's hearts generates Drigellum, which is forged into a sword. The party enter Mother's lair and fight her. Jaster again releases the power of the Star King. He reveals Mother as being a sorceress named Ilzarbella (Wendee Lee) who served the Star King until she was seduced by the power of Rune. Using the Drigellum sword, the Star King/Jaster kills her. As soon as the battle ends, the Emperor arrives with the intention of collecting the Rune energy to create beasts so as to continue the war, but Rune takes over the ship, killing Valkog and Norma, and integrating them into an organic vessel which it uses to attack Jaster and his group. The group split up, with each member attacking a separate part of the ship, eventually defeating it.

Mariglenn returns to its former self, and Kisala says goodbye to Freidias. When they return to their own galaxy, the group finds Mariglenn has reappeared. They visit and the Mariglenndians appoint Kisala as their new queen, much to the disappointment of Dorgengoa and Jaster. As Jaster and Monsha discuss the newly established galactic peace, Kisala is inaugurated as the new queen. Meanwhile, Simon returns to his family, Lilika returns to Bukaqua, Deego reunites with Angela, Steve returns to work with Dr. Pocacchio, Jupis resumes his scientific research, and Zegram remains on the Dorgenark. Later, Dorgenoa tells Jaster they are returning to Mariglenn to get back Kisala. The game ends with a narration saying the crew made off with their "ultimate treasure" in what was their very last heist, implying that they succeeded in getting Kisala, but are on the run from Mariglenn.

Development

Rogue Galaxy was first hinted at on August 1, 2003, when Level-5 revamped its website, and included a single image for a "New RPG". No further information was provided, although, at the time, some thought the game might be the rumored Dark Cloud 3. Nothing more was heard until February 2005, when Level-5 president Akihiro Hino revealed that "New RPG" was going to be released for the PlayStation 2, quelling rumors the game was being developed for the PlayStation Portable. The name was announced on July 19, when it was also revealed that the game would feature cel-shaded graphics in the style of previous Level-5 games, such as Dark Chronicle and Dragon Quest VIII: Journey of the Cursed King. Level-5 refer to the technique as "tonal rendering" - a mixture of cel-shaded 3D graphics for the main characters, set against detailed, realistic backgrounds. Hino was director of the project. The game was officially unveiled at the July 2005 PlayStation Meeting in Tokyo, where Hino said it had been in development for the past two and a half years, with its development time overlapping that of Dragon Quest VIII. He also revealed the game was the biggest project Level-5 had ever worked on, both in terms of production length and the number of staff working on the project.

In an August interview with Famitsu, Hino explained the gameplay involves the player travelling the galaxy and visiting various planets, each of which has its own unique visual theme. He claimed the total volume of areas to explore in the game would surpass any RPG to date. Originally, he had planned to feature a "virtually uncountable number of planets", which would be procedurally generated as the player explored them, but this concept was later modified to a smaller number of planets, each with multiple locations. He revealed a major selling point of the game to be no loading times between exploration and combat, or when moving from one location to another, something which had never before been accomplished on a disc-based RPG, and something which had been a long-time personal goal of his. He also went into detail about the backgrounds of Jaster, Kisala, Zegram and Lilika, and he explained the basic combat system (a hack and slash system using three party members, with the player able to issue commands to the two NPCs), the Revelation Flow system, and some basic information about the Factory system.

A trailer for the game was released on August 5, as was basic plot information. Also on August 5, the game's website went live. A playable demo of the game was made available at the 2005 Tokyo Game Show in September. IGN's Anoop Gantayat was impressed with the "seamless" gameplay, and the absence of load times, although he did note the frame rate was lower than Dragon Quest VIII. He was also impressed with the graphics: "The game doesn't hide the vastness of its world, with plenty of distant views as you explore the complicated landscapes. One may actually get the feeling of existing in the expansive world of a massively multiplayer online RPG rather than the limited world of standard RPG".

Playstation Underground sent Demo disk packages that came with a small poster of the game and pirate flag on the month of December, 2006.

The game was released in Japan on December 8, with no date set for North American or European releases. Both IGN and GameSpot played an import copy of the game, and both were impressed. IGN's Gantayat again praised the absence of loading times, arguing "the technical feats this game pulls off with the grey and limping PS2 hardware are impressive". He praised the pre-rendered CG cutscenes, and the smooth transition from these scenes to the gameplay itself. GameSpot's Bethany Massimilla wrote that "the visual style of the game is strongly inspired by cel-shading techniques, but the characters here aren't the flat and cartoony sort that you might ordinarily associate with the cel-shaded style. They exist and move in full 3D with lots of attention to detail in their attire and their movement, and they look great".

Music
The game's music was composed, arranged, and produced by Tomohito Nishiura. The two-disc, sixty-one track Rogue Galaxy  Original Soundtrack, was released in Japan on January 25, 2006 by King Records. The title's ending vocal track, "Dreaming My Way Home", is composed by Nishiura, and arranged and performed by Barbara Kessler. GameSpot wrote of the score: "Rogue Galaxys soundtrack is a robust and varied assortment of tunes that fit its epic scale".

On the same day, the single-disk, ten-track Rogue Galaxy Premium Arrange was published in Japan by TEAM Entertainment. Consisting of remixes of some of the tracks from the game, the album featured contributions from some of the Japanese video game industry's top composers, including Yasunori Mitsuda, Shinji Hosoe, Kenji Ito, Yoko Shimomura, Nobuyoshi Sano, Yoshitaka Hirota and Noriyuki Iwadare.

Localization improvements
In April 2006, Sony Computer Entertainment confirmed the localised version for a North American market. Also in E3 event in May, Level-5 revealed the English language version of the game is much more than a direct translation of the original Japanese version, but also to include multiple new features. Primary amongst these is a new planet with its own storyline, characters and items, as well as gameplay tweaks, such as Burning Strikes no longer happening randomly. Over one-hundred new items and weapons were also to be added to the game, and numerous character animations are improved. Initially for October 2006, the North American release date had been pushed back to January 2007 to facilitate further refinement.

At the 2006 Tokyo Game Show, the producer of the English localization, Nao Higo, called the new version of the game the "perfect version". He explained the team had taken on board criticisms regarding the difficulty of the original game, which was felt to be too easy in some places and too hard in others, and had created a more balanced difficulty level. He also explained the new world, the water world Alistia, is optional, but fully realized, with its own map, storylines, characters, missions and items. Improvements were also made to the graphics of the existing planets. He explained the Insectron minigame includes a multiplayer mode, whereby the player's team of insectrons would generate a code, which could be given to another player. When the second player enters the code in "Battle mode" at the Insectron tournament, they can use their team to fight the first player's team.

Other improvements include:

 The game is now housed on a double-layer 8.5GB DVD instead of the original 4.7GB DVD, which allows smoother graphics and additional data.
 Toady's weapon analysis is easier to use.
 The "Burning Strike" system has been altered. Players now collect Burning Chips during battle, which allows them to store power, and execute their Burning Strike when they wish. In the original game, the Burning Strikes happened randomly. The input section of the ability has also been changed, with full animations for each character as they perform each attack, and different animations for each character's five-hit, seven-hit, and nine-hit attacks.
 The layout and visual design of several dungeons and planets has been altered and improved; specifically Salgin, Rosencaster Prison, the Daytron factory, the Ruins on Rosa and the Gladius Towers.
 Two new species of Insectron have been added; the "Bomber Snail" and the "Spidan", each with eight types of Insectron per species.
 Each character has four additional costumes, except for Kisala and Simon, who have five each.
 Over 2000 lines of additional voiced dialogue has been added.
 Each character has three new abilities on their Revelation Flow, except for Lilika, who has four. Two new Combination abilities have also been added that team up Kisala with Lilika and Steve with Jupis.

PlayStation 4 re-release
Sony released the emulated PlayStation 4 version of the game in December 5, 2015, featuring 1080p graphics via up-rendering, trophy support, both Remote Play and Share Play compatibility and second screen support for the PlayStation Vita and PlayStation App.

Reception

Rogue Galaxy received "generally favorable reviews" according to the review aggregation website Metacritic.

Although Eurogamer's Simon Parkin praised the graphics and range of mini-games and side-quests, he felt the game's release after Final Fantasy XII placed an unrealizable burden of expectation upon it: "Many players will be expecting that game's new lessons in design to have been absorbed and even evolved here". He concluded, when "viewed objectively and set against the newest highpoints of the genre, aside from its gorgeous aesthetics and removal of load times, Rogue Galaxy just isn't the marvel it's been set up to be".

Game Revolution's Tim Tackett was critical of the plot, writing that "the characters lack backstories, and the emotional pitch never leaves the realm of Saturday morning cartoons". However, he praised the range of side-quests, the battle system, the graphics and the Revelation Flow, which he found superior to the License Board of Final Fantasy XII. He concluded: "The plot is a little dry and chewy, but the surrounding game is juicy and sweet. With a fairly lengthy, if substandard, main storyline crammed with lots of action and neat extra tidbits, Rogue Galaxy is a taste of the holidays, with none of the hassle".

GameTrailers was also critical of the plot: "What you have here is an unending parade of threadbare anime tropes predictably matched by bland characters. You've seen every one of these stereotypes before, acting out the same quests and forcing out the same emotions they do in just about every other RPG", but praised the gameplay and variety of side-quests, and concluded that "while it has plenty of problems, anyone who can get beyond the banal storytelling and stale level design will find something addictive and worthwhile in Rogue Galaxy. Grinding out levels and looking for items is rarely this rewarding, and it's obvious that Level 5 knows the depths of the role-player's mind all too well".

GameSpot's Greg Kasavin had mixed feelings about the combat system: "The combat gets to be repetitive after a while. Since you only have direct control over one character, who'll mostly depend on the same basic attacks regardless of which weapons you've equipped, the battles don't feel particularly varied from one to the next". He concluded: "The PlayStation 2 has delivered an almost countless number of high-quality Japanese role-playing games, so all the past competition is really the main reason why Rogue Galaxy doesn't come off as a stunning accomplishment. On the other hand, though, this is a game that does enough differently or better than most of its PS2 predecessors that it's still well deserving of your consideration".

IGN's Jeremy Dunham praised the graphics ("It's easily one of the top 20 best looking PS2 titles ever made") and the battle system, although he was somewhat critical of teammate AI. He also praised the range of side quests and mini-games. He concluded: "Rogue Galaxy definitely brings the noise to longtime RPG fans. Though its storyline isn't on the same level as other great PS2 games in the genre, its mixture of strong combat mechanics, addictive sidequests, and absolutely stunning visual style more than makes up for what it doesn't do".

GameSpy's Patrick Joynt's main criticism concerned the lack of character development: "Rogue Galaxy looks great and is technically stunning. It's packed utterly full of the standbys of the genre - combat, exploration, personalization, and sub-games that are too huge to be called "mini-games" - which are all executed well, but [...] the characters themselves seem entirely secondary to the matter at hand [...] they're as engaging as cardboard cutouts, largely because they're so predictable". In turn, he praised the range of mini-games and side-quests, and the overall size of the game, concluding:  "Rogue Galaxys greatest triumph, the brightest gleam in its eye, is that at sixty hours of play I've got another sixty I could easily pour in".

Sales and awards
Prior to the release of the game, Sony Computer Entertainment corporate executive Masatsuka Saeki had hoped it would sell a million units. Although it was the top-selling video game in Japan during the week ending December 11, 2005, selling 237,631 units, by the end of 2006, the game had sold only 356,192 units. In 2007, Rogue Galaxy: Director's Cut sold a further 29,457 units.

The game won a "Future Award" at the CESA Game Awards (2005) and an "Excellence in Digital Content" award at the Digital Contents Grandprix (2006). At the Famitsu Awards in 2006, it won both "Best RPG" and a "Special Rookie Award." It was named "Game of the Month" for January 2007 and given an "Editor's Choice" award by IGN, who, in 2010, placed it at #53 in their "Top 100 PlayStation 2 Games". It was also given an "Editor's Choice" award by GameSpy.

The Academy of Interactive Arts & Sciences named Rogue Galaxy as one of the nominees for 2007 "Roleplaying Game of the Year", but eventually lost to Mass Effect.

References

Notes

External links

2005 video games
Action role-playing video games
Level-5 (company) games
Multiplayer and single-player video games
PlayStation 2 games
PlayStation 2-only games
Role-playing games introduced in 2005
Science fiction video games
Sony Interactive Entertainment games
Space opera video games
Studio 4°C
Video games about pirates
Video games developed in Japan
Video games scored by Tomohito Nishiura
Video games set on fictional planets
Video games with cel-shaded animation